Word Manabí can refer to:
 Manabí Province
 Manabí (tribe)
 The manga and anime series Gakuen Utopia Manabi Straight! or the nickname of its main character Manami Amamiya.
 Manabi, a vessel of the Ecuadorian Navy (1943-1960), formerly the USS Opal (PYc-8)